Arushi Nishank is an Indian actress, dancer & model who is predominantly known for her work in the Indian film industry. She has appeared in Hindi cinema and web series.

Early life and education
Arushi Nishank was born (Father: Ramesh Pokhriyal, Mother: Kusum Kanta Pokhriyal) in Kotdwara, Uttarakhand to a financially humble family, where her father was the 5th Chief Minister of Uttarakhand between 27 June 2009 – 11 September 2011. Nishank completed her PhD in management from Uttarakhand Technical University in 2022.

Filmography

Films

References

External links

 

Indian film actresses
Female models from Uttarakhand
Living people
21st-century Indian actresses
Actresses in Hindi cinema
Actresses from Uttarakhand